Mauro Gianneschi (3 August 1931 – 21 January 2016) was an Italian racing cyclist. He won stage 11 of the 1954 Giro d'Italia.

References

External links
 

1931 births
2016 deaths
Italian male cyclists
Italian Giro d'Italia stage winners
Place of birth missing
Sportspeople from the Province of Pistoia
Cyclists from Tuscany